J. David Crum (born December 31, 1945, in Clay Center, Kansas) is a former Republican member of the Kansas House of Representatives, representing the 77th district. He served from 2007 to 2015.

Crum, who received his BS and OD from the University of Houston, has worked as an optometrist since 1969.  He was the mayor of Augusta, Kansas from 1990 to 1998.

In the past Crum has served as president for Kansas Eyecare Services, Kansas Optometric Association, and Augusta Kiwanas Club. The American Conservative Union has given him a rating of 100%. He lives in Augusta, Kansas, is married to Betty Crum, and has two children.

Committee membership
Appropriations
Health and Human Services (Vice-Chair)
Social Services Budget

Major donors
The top 5 donors to Crum's 2008 campaign were professional organizations:
1. Kansas Dental Assoc   $850 	
2. Kansas Hospital Assoc $750 	
3. Kansas Bankers Assoc  $750 	
4. Kansas Independent Business PAS $750 	
5. Kansas Chamber of Commerce 	$750

References

External links
Official Website
Kansas Legislature - J. Crum
Project Vote Smart profile
Kansas Votes profile
Campaign contributions: 2008 General

Republican Party members of the Kansas House of Representatives
People from Augusta, Kansas
1945 births
Living people
Mayors of places in Kansas
21st-century American politicians
University of Houston alumni